Federal Telecommunications System 2000 (FTS2000) is a long distance telecommunications service for the United States federal government, including services such as switched voice service for voice or data up to 4.8 kbit/s, switched data at 56 kbit/s and 64 kbit/s, switched digital integrated service for voice, data, image, and video up to 1.544 Mbit/s, packet switched service for data in packet form, video transmission for both compressed and wideband video, and dedicated point-to-point private line for voice and data. 

Note 1:  Use of FTS2000 contract services is mandatory for use by U.S. Government agencies for all acquisitions subject to 40 U.S.C. 759. 

Note 2:  No U.S. Government information processing equipment or customer premises equipment other than that which are required to provide an FTS2000 service are furnished. 

Note 3:  The FTS2000 contractors will be required to provide service directly to an agency's terminal equipment interface. For example, the FTS2000 contractor might provide a terminal adapter to an agency location in order to connect FTS2000 ISDN services to the agency's terminal equipment. 

Note 4:  GSA awarded two 10-year, fixed-price contracts covering FTS2000 services on December 7, 1988. 

Note 5:  The Warner Amendment excludes the mandatory use of FTS2000 in instances related to maximum security.
FTS2000 was completed in 2000, then replaced by FTS2001, and thereafter, in 2008, by Networx.

References
FTS2000 was completed in 2000, and was replaced by FTS2001.

Telecommunication services
Telecommunications in the United States